Allan Walton (20 October 1891 – 12 September 1948) was a British painter. His work was part of the painting event in the art competition at the 1948 Summer Olympics.

References

1891 births
1948 deaths
20th-century British painters
British male painters
Olympic competitors in art competitions
People from Cheadle Hulme
19th-century British male artists
20th-century British male artists